This is a list of flag bearers who have represented East Germany at the Olympics.

Flag bearers carry the national flag of their country at the opening ceremony of the Olympic Games.

See also
East Germany at the Olympics
List of flag bearers for Germany at the Olympics
List of flag bearers for West Germany at the Olympics

References

Flag
Germany
Olympic flagbearers